Ranja Hauglid (born 25 April 1945 in Stor-Elvdal) is a Norwegian politician for the Labour Party.

She was elected to the Norwegian Parliament from Troms in 1981, and was re-elected on three occasions.

Hauglid was a deputy member of the executive committee of Salangen municipality council during the terms 1979–1983 and 1999–2003.

References

1945 births
Living people
Labour Party (Norway) politicians
Women members of the Storting
Members of the Storting
20th-century Norwegian politicians
20th-century Norwegian women politicians
People from Stor-Elvdal